Allen Mezquida is an illustrator and jazz saxophonist.

Biography
Mezquida was a jazz alto saxophonist in the New York area for much of the 1980s and 1990s. He recorded one album as leader – A Good Thing, which was released by Koch in 1996. His quartet for the album was Bill Mays or Brad Mehldau on piano, bassist Sean Smith, and drummer Leon Parker. In the late 1990s, Mezquida decided to try something else: he later commented that "I was feeling underappreciated, a lot of self-pity", and "I was more frustrated with jazz's tiny place in the current cultural landscape than with my jazz career".

He then drew cartoons and took up digital animation. After moving to Los Angeles, he got work for major film studios. He later described this as "executing the ideas of morons that I didn't respect", and started a YouTube channel for his animated creation, Smigly.

Mezquida played saxophone on Molly Ringwald's Except Sometimes.

Discography

As leader
A Good Thing (Koch)

As sideman
With Cow Bop (Bruce Forman)
Too Hick for the Room (B4Man)
With Mark Murphy
Links (HighNote)
With Molly Ringwald
Except Sometimes (Concord)
With Sean Smith
Sean Smith Quartet Live! (Chiaroscuro)

References

External links
 Official website.

Jazz alto saxophonists